The Flood is a fictional parasitic alien lifeform and one of the primary antagonists in the Halo multimedia franchise. First introduced in the 2001 video game Halo: Combat Evolved, it returns in later entries in the series such as Halo 2, Halo 3, and Halo Wars. The Flood is driven by a desire to infect any sentient life of sufficient size; Flood-infected creatures, also called Flood, in turn can infect other hosts. The parasite is depicted as such a threat that the ancient Forerunners constructed artificial ringworld superweapons known as Halos to contain it and, as a last resort, to kill all sentient life in the galaxy in an effort to stop the Flood's spread by starving it.

The Flood's design and fiction were led by Bungie artist Robert McLees, who used unused concepts from the earlier Bungie game Marathon 2. The setting of the first game, the ringworld Halo, was stripped of many of its large creatures in order to make the Flood's surprise appearance more startling. Bungie environment artist Vic DeLeon spent six months of pre-production time refining the Flood's fleshy aesthetic and designing the organic interiors of Flood-infested spaceships for Halo 3.

The player's discovery of the Flood in Halo: Combat Evolved is a major plot twist, and was one of the surprises reviewers noted positively. The Flood's return in Halo 2 and Halo 3 was less enthusiastically praised. Reaction to the Flood has varied. While some critics have described the Flood as derivative or clichéd, others have ranked it among the greatest video game villains.

Development

The Flood is depicted as a parasitic organism that infects any sentient life of sufficient size. The largest self-contained form that the Flood can produce itself without using other biomass is an "infection form". These forms seeks hosts, living or dead, and attempt to drive sharp spines into the host and thereby tap into the nervous system. The host is incapacitated while the infection form burrows into the host's body and begins the mutation process, bringing the host under Flood control. Depending on the size or condition of the body, the infection form mutates the hapless host into various specialized forms in the continual drive for more food. Larger hosts are turned into forms for combat, growing long whip-like tentacles, while mangled and disused hosts are turned into incubators for more infection forms. The Flood also creates forms known as "key minds" to coordinate the Flood; these include the apex of Flood evolution, known as "Graveminds".

The Flood was added early in Bungie's development of the 2001 video game Halo: Combat Evolved, before the game had made its jump from the Macintosh platform to the Xbox. A design for one Flood form appeared as early as 1997. Commenting upon the inception of the Flood, Bungie staff member Chris Butcher noted that "the idea behind the Flood as the forgotten peril that ended a galaxy-spanning empire is a pretty fundamental tenet of good sci-fi. Yeah, and bad sci-fi too." Another inspiration was Christopher Rowley's The Vang series. Early design for the Flood was done by Bungie artist and writer Robert McLees, who considers himself "the architect" of the Flood; the Flood's roots are reflected in concept art of a "fungal zombie" that McLees did for the earlier Bungie game Marathon 2: Durandal. McLees also did all the early concept art for the Flood.

Based on the behavior of viruses and certain bacteria, the Flood was intended to be "disgusting and nasty"; McLees modeled one Flood form off the memory of his cousin's infected thumb. The creatures were constructed from the corpses and bodies of former combatants, so the artists had to make sure the Flood soldiers were recognizable while changing their silhouette enough to differentiate them from the uninfected. Many concepts and ideas were discarded due to time constraints—initially, the Flood was intended to convert any species of the alien Covenant into soldiers. "We didn't have the resources to make it happen," McLees recalled, so they modified the game's fiction to suggest that some Covenant were too small or too frail to serve as combat troops. The technical inability to create different Flood forms procedurally informed the game's fiction that the Flood had optimized their host forms over years of trial and error, creating standardized templates that the developers used to obfuscate the repeated use of similar models. Likewise, the Flood enemy intelligence was intended to be as complicated as that of the other enemy faction in the game, but full implementation was cut for time. The dinosaur-like terrestrial wildlife that originally dwelled in Halo's environments were dropped due to gameplay constraints and fear that their presence would reduce the surprise and impact of the Flood.

Bungie decided a new visual language for the Flood was needed for Halo 3. The task of developing the new Flood forms, organic Flood terrain, and other miscellaneous changes fell to Vic DeLeon, then Bungie's Senior Environment Artist. Early concepts of what became new morphing Flood types in the game called "pure forms" featured the creatures wielding an array of weapons via tendrils, while forms like the Flood infector and Flood transport concepts never made it into the final game. The pure forms had to morph between three radically different looks, and it proved challenging to make plausible transformations that also looked good once it was developed and animated in 3D. Artist Shi Kai Wang suggested that in the end, they had simply tried to do too much and the results were less than they wanted.

Flood-infested structures were designed as angular to counterbalance Flood biomass, as well as provide surfaces for the game's artificial intelligence to exploit and move on. New additions were designed to be multi-purpose; exploding "growth pods" that spew Flood forms were added to the game to adjust pacing, provide instant action, and add to the visuals. Endoscopic pictures provided further inspiration. Halo 3 added new capabilities to the Flood, including the ability for the parasite to infect enemies in real time. Bungie used Halo 3s improved capacity for graphics to make a host's sudden transformation into Flood form more dramatic; two different character models and skeletons were fused and swapped in real-time.

Appearances

Games
The Flood makes its first appearance more than halfway through Halo: Combat Evolved, during the story mission "343 Guilty Spark". A group of humans fleeing the enemy alien Covenant land on "Halo", a ringworld built by the alien Forerunners. The artificial intelligence Cortana sends the supersoldier Master Chief to find their commander, Jacob Keyes, who disappeared in a swamp while searching for a weapons cache. The Master Chief discovers that the Covenant have accidentally released the Flood. Keyes' squad is turned into soldiers for the parasite, while Keyes is interrogated by the Flood in an attempt to learn the location of Earth and ultimately assimilated. The emergence of the Flood prompts Halo's caretaker artificial intelligence 343 Guilty Spark to enlist the help of the Master Chief in activating Halo's defenses and preventing a Flood outbreak. When Master Chief learns that activating Halo would instead wipe the galaxy of sentient life to prevent the Flood's spread, he and Cortana detonate the human ship Pillar of Autumns engines, destroying the ring and preventing the Flood from escaping.

The Flood returns in Halo 2 (2004), appearing on another Halo ring called "Delta Halo". The Flood on Delta Halo is led by the Gravemind, a massive Flood intelligence that dwells in the bowels of the ring. Gravemind brings together the Master Chief and the Covenant holy warrior known as the Arbiter and tasks them with stopping the Covenant leadership from activating the ring. In the meantime, Gravemind infests the human ship In Amber Clad and crashes it into the Covenant space station of High Charity. Once there, the Flood sweeps through the city, and the Gravemind captures Cortana. As the Flood spreads, the Covenant form a blockade in an effort to prevent the parasite from leaving its prison.

The Flood reappears in the Halo 3 mission "Floodgate", on board a damaged ship that escapes the quarantine around Delta Halo. While the infestation of Earth is prevented, Master Chief and Arbiter form a tenuous alliance with the Flood to stop the activation of all the Halo rings at the Forerunner installation known as the Ark. Once the threat is stopped, the Gravemind turns on them. The Master Chief fights his way to the center of High Charity, freeing Cortana and destroying the city, but Gravemind attempts to rebuild itself on a Halo under construction at the Ark. Realizing that activating the ring will destroy only the local Flood infestation due to the Ark's location outside of the Milky Way, the Master Chief, Arbiter, and Cortana proceed to Halo's control room, activate the ring, and escape. The Gravemind warns them that his defeat will only delay the Flood, not stop it.

The Flood also makes an appearance in the video game spinoffs Halo Wars and Halo Wars 2. In Halo Wars, they are encountered infesting a Forerunner installation and ultimately annihilated by the actions of the human ship Spirit of Fires crew. In the Halo Wars 2 expansion "Awakening the Nightmare", the surviving Flood were accidentally released by the Banished while salvaging the wreck of High Charity. The Flood also serves as an enemy in the game's cooperative "Firefight" mode. The Flood also appear in cooperative play in Halo: Spartan Assault.

With Halo 3, the developers added a multiplayer gametype called "Infection", a last man standing mode based on a fan-created scenario where human players defend against Flood-infected players, with each slain human adding to the infected's ranks. The game mode returned in Halo: Reach (2010), Halo 4 (2012), renamed "Flood", The Master Chief Collection (2014), and Halo 5.

Other appearances
The 2006 anthology The Halo Graphic Novel expands upon the Flood's release during the events of Halo: Combat Evolved in two stories, Last Voyage of the Infinite Succor and "Breaking Quarantine". Whereas the Flood is only hinted at being intelligent in the game, the Halo Graphic Novel shows the Flood has a hive mind, assimilating the knowledge of their hosts rapidly. Lee Hammock, writer of The Last Voyage of the Infinite Succor, described the basis of the story as a way to showcase the true danger of the Flood as an intelligent menace, rather than something the player encounters and shoots. Hammock also stated that the story would prove the intelligent nature of the Flood, and "hopefully euthanize the idea that they are just space zombies". The threat of the Flood is also highlighted in a short story from the Halo Evolutions anthology, "The Mona Lisa," which was later adapted into a motion comic.

The Flood also features heavily in Greg Bear's trilogy of novels, the Forerunner Saga, which takes place thousands of years before the events of the main games. The novel Halo: Silentium reveals that the Flood is what remains of the Precursors, an ancient race that was said to accelerate the evolution of a species and shape galaxies. The Forerunners overthrew the Precursors; on the verge of extinction, some Precursors reduced themselves to a biological powder that would regenerate into their past selves. Time rendered the powder defective, and it became mutagenic, reacting with other living organisms to produce what would eventually mutate into the Flood. The Flood would threaten ancient humanity and then the Forerunners, who ultimately build and activate the Halo Array to stop the parasite's spread.

Analysis

The name of the Flood is one of many names taken from religious stories in the Halo franchise. The Flood and especially the Gravemind serve as demonic or satanic figures, and the Master Chief's descent into the bowels of Halo to encounter the Flood can be likened to a journey to hell. Academic P.C. Paulissen notes that the name 'Flood' suggests a reference to the biblical deluge, with the Forerunner Ark being shelter from the Flood's destructive and cleansing power akin to the Bible.

The lifecycle and parasitic nature of the Flood has similarities to the behaviors of real-world parasites. The Flood's induced physiological changes recall the modified eyestalks of hosts infected by Leucochloridium paradoxum, or malformed limbs of Ribeiroia-infected amphibians. The Flood's habit of altering its surroundings has parallels to the parasitoid wasp Hymenoepimecis argyraphagas use of spider's webs for protection.

Cultural impact

Merchandise
The Flood have been featured in four series of Halo action figures, produced by Joyride Studios. For Halo: Combat Evolved, Joyride produced a Carrier Form and Infection form bundle. Halo 2s series contains both a human combat form and infection form (bundled with the Master Chief), which were released after the video game. Armchair Empire's review of the figure expressed the sentiment that Joyride's models could not totally capture the ghoulishness texture and detail of the Flood. McFarlane Toys produced action figures for Halo 3, and the third released series featured a human combat form. Other merchandise includes an Xbox 360 Avatar prop, and a limited edition silver-plated statue of Master Chief fighting a Flood form.

Critical reception
The surprise appearance of the Flood during Halo: Combat Evolved was seen as an important plot twist and a scary moment even after repeat playthroughs of the game. Gamasutra, writing about video game plots, gives the example of the Flood not only as an important reversal to the story of Halo, but an example of how games are made more interesting by twists in the plot. Rolling Stone and Kotaku credited the appearance of the Flood as an excellent way the game kept players on their toes, forcing them to adjust their strategies; Rolling Stone called the twist as shocking "as if, several levels into a game of Pac-Man, the dots suddenly began to attack you". IGN described Flood as one of their favorite video game monsters of all time, stating that "We like the Flood, but we hate them so very much."

Despite the positive acclaim in Halo, the response to the presence of the Flood in Halo 2 and Halo 3 was mixed. A panel of online reviewers noted that the Flood appeared in Halo 2 for no obvious reasons, and was simply described as "aggravating" to play against. Similarly, reviewers including Victor Godinez of The Dallas Morning News felt that the Flood was too derivative of other sci-fi stereotypes, and functioned as "space zombies". Daniel Weissenberger of Gamecritics.com noted in his review of Halo 3 that even though the Flood looked better than ever, its single strategy of rushing the player proved tedious over time. GamesRadar's Charlie Barratt listed the Flood as the worst part of Halo, contrasting what he considered fun, vibrant and open levels before the Flood's appearance with confined spaces and predictable enemies.

The Flood has been recognized as one of the greatest game villains, making lists of greatest villains and enemies from Wizard Magazine, GameDaily, Guinness World Records Gamer's Edition, PC World, and Electronic Gaming Monthly. MTV considered Flood possession in Halo 3 as a "great gaming moment" of 2007, stating that "with the power of the Xbox 360's graphics, this reanimation comes to vivid, distressing life, more memorably than it had in the earlier games. Here are the zombies of gaming doing what they do worst. [...] It's grisly and unforgettable." IGN listed the Flood as the 45th best video game villain, describing it as one of the most hated video game villains.

References

External links

 Flood Archives at halo.bungie.org
 The Flood profile at Halowaypoint.com

Extraterrestrial characters in video games
Fictional extraterrestrial life forms
Fictional parasites and parasitoids
Fictional superorganisms
Halo (franchise)
Mutant characters in video games
Undead characters in video games
Video game characters introduced in 2001
Video game species and races